Thulani Mbenge (born July 15, 1991) is a South African professional boxer. As an amateur, he won a bronze medal at the 2014 Commonwealth Games.

Amateur career
Mbenge was an outstanding amateur before joining the professional ranks, winning the South African junior welterweight championships in 2010 and 2011, and a bronze medal at the 2014 Commonwealth Games in Glasgow, Scotland.

Professional career
As a professional Mbenge has won South African, WBC, IBO and African Boxing Union titles.

Professional boxing record

References

Living people
1991 births
South African male boxers
Welterweight boxers
Boxers at the 2014 Commonwealth Games
Commonwealth Games medallists in boxing
International Boxing Organization champions
African Boxing Union champions
Commonwealth Games bronze medallists for South Africa
Medallists at the 2014 Commonwealth Games